The Mawson Station, commonly called Mawson, is one of three permanent bases and research outposts in Antarctica managed by the Australian Antarctic Division (AAD). Mawson lies in Holme Bay in Mac. Robertson Land, East Antarctica in the Australian Antarctic Territory, a territory claimed by Australia. Established in 1954, Mawson is Australia's oldest Antarctic station and the oldest continuously inhabited Antarctic station south of the Antarctic Circle. It houses approximately 20 personnel over winter and up to 53 in summer. 

Mawson was named in honour of the Australian Antarctic explorer Sir Douglas Mawson.

Mawson was listed on the Register of the National Estate in 2001 and listed on the Commonwealth Heritage List on 22 June 2004, reflecting the post-World War Two revival of Australia's scientific research and territorial interests in Antarctica.

Purpose
Mawson Station is a base for scientific research programs including an underground cosmic ray detector, various long-term meteorological aeronomy and geomagnetic studies, as well as ongoing conservation biology studies, in particular of nearby Auster rookery, a breeding ground for emperor penguins and Adélie penguins.

History
In 1946, the Minister for External Affairs, H.V. Evatt indicated his support for a proposal by Douglas Mawson for the establishment of a permanent Australian base in Antarctica. It was another seven years before a suitable ship, the Kista Dan could be chartered to set up facilities on the southern continent.

The station site was chosen in 1953 by Phillip Law, the first director of the AAD, who drew aerial photographs taken during the U.S. Operation Highjump (OpHjp) of 1946-1947 to select the site for its large natural harbour (Horseshoe Harbour) and permanently exposed rock for building. The station was built during 1954. Some of the small pre-fabricated huts used in the first years remain on the station, but these are overshadowed by large steel-framed modular buildings dating from a major rebuilding program that started in the late 1970s.

By 1959, the facilities at Mawson Station had expanded significantly. Personnel at that time included 6 scientists, 4 technicians, 2 pilots, 2 weather observers, and 10 others. Scientific disciplines represented included cartography, geology and geomagnetism, glaciology, seismology, ionospheric and auroral physics, meteorology, and physiology. Vehicles included 2 de Havilland Canada DHC-2 Beaver aircraft, 3 Caterpillar D4 tractors, 1 TEA-20 Ferguson, and 1 Sno-Cat.

Geography
Mawson Station is located at Holme Bay in Mac Robertson Land, East Antarctica, named in January 1930 by Sir Douglas Mawson during the first British Australian and New Zealand Antarctic Research Expedition (BANZARE) voyage, aboard Discovery. It is in a region which Mawson proclaimed as British territory on several occasions in 1930 and 1931 (including at Proclamation Island, Scullin Monolith and Cape Bruce), and later became Australian Antarctic Territory.

Some notable geographic features in the region include the Framnes Mountains, which form the dramatic backdrop to Mawson Station. The Framnes Mountains were named in the 1930s by Norwegian explorers financed by the shipowner and whaling magnate Lars Christensen.

Climate
Mawson Station experiences a Polar climate:

Research
During March and April 1960, an ANARE survey party from Mawson Station carried out a barometric mapping control traverse along the route of a  dog sledge journey from Cape Batterbee through the Napier Mountains to Martin Island in Edward VIII Bay. The members of this survey party — led by Syd Kirkby — were the first people to set foot in the Napier Mountains. The highest peak of this small range — Mount Elkins — was identified and named at this time for Terence James Elkins. Many other terrain features were mapped, visited or named as a result of this expedition, including Armstrong Peak, Bird Ridge, Mount Griffiths, Newman Nunataks, Wilkinson Peaks, and the Young Nunataks. 

In 2018, astronaut and academic Jay C. Buckey conducted research using virtual reality, at the Australian Antarctic Division’s Mawson Station, wherein the expeditioners used VR headsets to view Australian beach scenes, European nature scenes, and North American nature scenes of forests and urban environments, which were different from the isolation of the whiteness and silence of Antarctica. The research will inform psychological techniques to support long-duration spaceflight such as for astronauts going to Mars.

Logistics

Communications
Mawson's infrastructure includes an ANARESAT satellite antenna Earth station for communication.

Air transport
In early summer when sea ice conditions are most favourable, a ski landing area (SLA) is constructed adjacent to Mawson.  As sea ice conditions progressively worsen over summer, operations are moved to Rumdoodle SLA, a field camp on the inland ice plateau 10 km from Mawson. 

Rumdoodle SLA has been in use since the 1950s, and the glacier surface requires annual inspection and preparation prior to use. It is accessible from Mawson by Hägglunds ground vehicles.

Sea transport
Mawson Station is accessible by sea for only a short period each austral summer, between February and March.
It has a deep, sheltered natural harbour and is ice-free in February.  A direct voyage from Hobart to Mawson takes about 10—12 days, due to variable weather and sea-ice conditions. The approach to Horseshoe Harbour is through the Mawson Corridor and the Entrance Shoal.

Between 1953 and 1987, Mawson was supplied by the ice-strengthened polar research vessels, including Kista Dan, Magga Dan, Thala Dan, and Nella Dan. This period came to an end when Nella Dan ran aground and sank at Macquarie Island on 3 December 1987.

Wind power
Mawson  is the only Antarctic station to use wind generators designed to take advantage of the fierce katabatic winds. Two 300 kW wind turbines  were installed in 2003, but one failed in 2017.

See also
 List of Antarctic research stations
 List of Antarctic field camps
 Marble Rock (Antarctica)
 Mawson Corridor

References

Further reading

External links

 Official website Australian Antarctic Division
 Australian Antarctic Division's Mawson Station page
 Mawson Station webcam
 Restoration of Biscoe Hut, one of the original 1954 buildings
 COMNAP Antarctic Facilities
 COMNAP Antarctic Facilities Map
 
 

Australian Antarctic Territory
East Antarctica
Outposts of Antarctica
1954 establishments in Australia
Commonwealth Heritage List
Earth stations in the Antarctic Territory Australia
1954 establishments in Antarctica